The Latvian diaspora refers to Latvians and people of Latvian descent residing outside Latvia.

According to estimates by the Latvian Foreign Ministry, as at 2012, about 370,000 Latvian citizens permanently resided outside of Latvia, most of them having emigrated in the preceding decade. The largest Latvian communities are in the United Kingdom, the United States, Canada, Ireland, Sweden, Australia, New Zealand, Russia, Brazil, Belgium, Israel, Norway, Finland and Spain.

History

Late 19th century and early 20th century
While Latvia was part of the Russian Empire, many Latvians left to other regions of Russia (for instance, Bashkiria) looking for opportunities to farm, as well as for Latin America and Australia. The next large wave of emigration was related to World War I, when thousands of refugees and evacuated factory workers moved to other regions of Russia. Many of the refugees returned after Latvia became independent, others formed communities in Russia, Ukraine and the Caucasus. A significant number of Latvians from the ranks of the Bolshevik Latvian Riflemen occupied senior positions in the early Soviet Russia and Soviet Union.

After World War II
A large wave of emigration from Latvia followed the Soviet and Nazi German occupations of the country during World War II.

More than 200,000 Latvian citizens died during World War II and the Nazi occupation, thousands of Latvians fled the country. The largest communities of Latvians were established in the United States, Canada, Sweden, Great Britain and Australia.

The Latvian diaspora in the West actively worked for the restoration of Latvia's independence. The Latvian Diplomatic Service represented the interests of independent Latvia in the Free World during the Soviet occupation.

Simultaneously, Latvians migrated within the Soviet Union from the Latvian SSR to other Soviet Republics. A number of Latvian Jews emigrated to Israel and the United States.

After 2004
Following Latvia's accession to the European Union and the financial crisis of 2007–2008, as many as 200,000 Latvians left the country. As of 2016, about 100,000 Latvians permanently lived in the United Kingdom.

The Latvian diaspora provides around €500 million per year to the Latvian economy.

Organisations

There are currently more than 100 Latvian schools across the world.

Groups of Latvian artists in exile
Latvian art historian Jānis Siliņš, in 1990, described the movement to which Mark Rothko, Jānis Kalmīte, Lucia Peka, Mārtiņš Krūmiņš and other Latvian-Americans belong as "those artists who amidst the changing trends of contemporary art, after thirty years in exile and emigration, as still basically close to and developing the traditions of their homeland art - of the 'Latvian or Riga School'"

Artists of the Latvian diaspora include:
Maurice Sterne (1878–1957) painter
Hugo Kārlis Grotuss (1884–1951) painter
Isac Friedlander (1890–1968) printmaker
Jāzeps Grosvalds (1891–1920) painter
Aleksandra Belcova (1892–1981) painter
Mārtiņš Krūmiņš (1900 to 1992) painter
Mark Rothko (1903–1970) Painter
Philippe Halsman (1906–1979) photographer
Jānis Kalmīte (1907–1996) painter
Wally Brants (1909–1998) painter
Lucia Peka (1912–1991) painter
Vija Celmins (born 1939) painter

In 2004, in the state of Illinois, the Global Society for Latvian Art was created to track the Latvian Diaspora. It is a nonprofit 501(c)(3) corporation, whose stated mission is “to promote, preserve, and exhibit works of art created by artists who were exiled from Latvia as a result of the Second World War as well as other artists of Latvian descent; to promote and encourage global communication among persons interested in Latvian art and culture; to establish and operate a museum of Latvian diaspora art dedicated to collecting, studying, exhibiting and preserving such art; and to work with all existing Latvian-American organizations and other organizations in trust and harmony and to develop close ties between Latvian-Americans and others whose goals are to support and promote Latvian art and other Latvian cultural art forms.”

Vision: To establish a world center/museum for Latvian art in Latvia, the central focus of which will be to collect art representing Latvian artists from the United States, Canada, Australia, Sweden, South America, Europe, and wherever else Latvian artists have lived and worked outside of Latvia. The collection will be created through donations from artists, their families, organizations and private collectors, subject to guidelines developed by the Global Society for Latvian Art (see Donate Artwork). The center will present exhibits from its permanent collection, invitational shows, and the work of local Latvian artists, in order to explore various curatorial themes and to contribute to the artistic education of the public. The center will be a resource for scholarly research about Latvian artists, featuring an electronic database as well as physical documents and other materials pertaining to the collection and to the historical period it represents.

See also
 Latvian Diplomatic Service
 Latvian American
 Latvian Australian
 Latvian Canadian
 Baltic people in the United Kingdom
 Latvian Finns

External links
DaugavasVanagi.co.uk Latvian Welfare Fund/Daugavas Vanagu Fonds
Draudze.org.uk United London Latvian Church
LVChamber.uk - Latvian Chamber of Commerce for the United Kingdom

References

 
European diasporas